Bagdad is a rural community in Queens County, New Brunswick, Canada.

See also 
 List of communities in New Brunswick

References 

Communities in Queens County, New Brunswick